Jacques Perrin de Brichambaut (18 October 1920, Paris – 17 March 2007, Paris)
was a French ornithologist.

His bird collections are held by Muséum de Toulouse. The Jacques Perrin de Brichambaut egg collection includes all the Palearctic species (Europe, North Africa and Asia), that is to say approximately 1,000 species and nearly 15,000 eggs and is one of the most complete and best documented palearctic egg collections in Europe.

Works
Quelques observations sur le terrain Oiseaux de France 1951
Capture d’un aigle doré dans la région de Paris Oiseaux de France 1951
Chevalier guignette et Hirondelle de rivage Oiseaux de France 1953
Les becs-croisés à Noirmoutier Oiseaux de France 1953
Quelques remarques sur le Goëland argenté des côtes de France Oiseaux de France 1954
Passage d’oiseaux aquatique en baie de Seine Oiseaux de France 1954
Le Bec-croisé Oiseaux de France 1955
Quelques observations dans la région de Toulouse Oiseaux de France 1956
Observations aux Marais Vernier (Quillebeuf)Oiseaux de France 1956
Observations de pigeons ramiers Alauda1956
Bec-croisés dans l’Oise Alauda 1957
Cigogne blanche nidificatrice dans la région de Toulouse Alauda 1957
Reproduction des hirondelles en 1957 Alauda 1957
Observations aux îles Chausey Alauda 1963
Destruction curieuse d’une nichée de hulotte Alauda 1963
Le harle bièvre Mergus merganser sur le lac de Genève Alauda 1968
Mésange à moustaches Panurus biarmicus en Brière Alauda 1969
Nidification de la barge à queue noire et présence d’aigrettes garzettes en baie d’Audierne  Alauda 1969
Tourterelle turque à Beg-Meil en 1967 Alauda 1969
Nidification possible de la barge à queue noire et présence d’aigrettes garzettes en baie d’Audierne Alauda1969
Aigrette garzette sur le lac de Genève Alauda 1969
Hivernage d’avocettes dans la région de Saint-Nazaire Alauda 1969
Reproduction de la bécassine des marais Capella gallinago et migration des bondrées Pernis apivorus aux marais de Saint-Gond  Alauda 1973
Contribution de l’oologie à la connaissance de la biologie du coucou-gai Clamator glandarius Alauda 1973
Mode de dépouillement de mammifères moyens par deux rapaces Alauda  1978
Comportement particulier d’une mésange nonette Parus palustris Alauda 1978
Observations sur l’île de Beniguet, archipel de Molène Alauda 1978
Examen microscopique de la surface des coquilles d’œufs d’oiseaux Alauda 1982
Mimétisme des œufs de coucou gris Cuculus canorus Alauda 1993
Le comportement parasitaire du coucou gris Cuculus canorus : comparaisons régionales, évolutions dans le temps Alauda 1997

References
Jacques Perrin de Brichambaut

French ornithologists
1920 births
2007 deaths
Egg collectors
Oologists
20th-century French zoologists